Storyline may refer to:
 The plot or subplot of a story
 The narrative of a work, whether of fictional or nonfictional basis
 The narrative threads experienced by each character or set of characters in a work of fiction
 The storyline method of teaching
 Alternative term for an angle in professional wrestling – see Glossary of professional wrestling terms: Angle
 Storyline (TV series), a current affairs show in the Philippines

Music
 Storyline (Raphe Malik album), 2000
 Story Line, 1991 album by Lorie Line
 Storyline, 2005 album by Mari Wilson
 Storyline (Hunter Hayes album), 2014